Nizhnyaya Dobrinka is a rural locality (a selo) and the administrative center of Nizhnedobrinskoye Rural Settlement, Zhirnovsky District, Volgograd Oblast, Russia. The population was 1,484 as of 2010. There are 18 streets.

Geography 
Nizhnyaya Dobrinka is located on the left bank of the Medveditsa River, 24 km south of Zhirnovsk (the district's administrative centre) by road. Yegorovka-na-Medveditse is the nearest rural locality.

References 

Rural localities in Zhirnovsky District
Kamyshinsky Uyezd